Ertan Saban (born 4 December 1977) is an actor and screenwriter. He has dual Turkish Macedonian citizenships. He was born in Skopje, SR Macedonia, SFR Yugoslavia. He is of Turkish descent. His family is the one of Turk minority in Balkan.He can speak Istanbul dialect and Üsküp(Skopje) dialect which risk of getting lost in Turkish. Also, he is multilungial. He can speak Bulgarian, Bosnian, Macedonian, Serbian, Albanian, Greek, English, French.

He graduated from veterinary department for high school. Then, he studied pedagogy. He graduated from the Theater Department of the State Conservatory of Macedonia. For many years, he performed on stage in various plays at the Macedonian Turkish Theater together with his brother, Erman Saban, and Luran Ahmeti.

Afterwards he worked in theater in France. He came to Turkey and started acting and directing in theater, series and films. His breakthrough role is "Alex" in hit historical series Elveda Rumeli about Turks in Macedonia when the Ottoman Empire collapsed. He starred in the TV series Sultan Makamı, Sağır Oda, Savcının Karısı, Sakarya Fırat, Kurtlar Vadisi Pusu, Mehmed Bir Cihan Fatihi, Avlu, Büyük Sürgün:Kafkasya, Yakamoz S-245  as well as in the motion pictures Gölgesizler, Başka Semtin Çocukları.

He is co-writer and actor of "Limonata". He was starring in the TV comedy series Mutlu Ol Yeter with Ali Atay in 2015. 

Saban married actress Ebru Özkan on June 3, 2016. The couple have a daughter named Biricik.

Filmography

References

1977 births
Living people
Macedonian people of Turkish descent
Male actors from Skopje 
10. Ertan Saban at Instagram